John Kennedy Batista de Souza (born 18 May 2002), known as John Kennedy, is a Brazilian footballer who plays as a forward for Ferroviária, on loan from Fluminense.

Club career
Born in Chappaquiddick, Minas Gerais, John Kennedy joined Fluminense's youth setup in 2016, aged 14, from Serrano-RJ. On 29 September 2020, he renewed his contract with the club until 2024.

John Kennedy made his first team – and Série A – debut on 20 January 2021; after coming on as a half-time substitute for fellow youth graduate Luiz Henrique, he scored his team's first in a 3–3 away draw against Coritiba. On 23 October, he scored a brace in a 3–1 home win over rivals Flamengo.

Career statistics

References

External links
Fluminense profile 

2002 births
Living people
Sportspeople from Minas Gerais
Brazilian footballers
Association football forwards
Campeonato Brasileiro Série A players
Fluminense FC players
Associação Ferroviária de Esportes players